Roma Babuniak (born in England, 25 March 1952) is an artist whose work is associated with bone china and unglazed biscuit porcelain.  She lived and worked in Germany from 1981 to 2014, and is currently living and working in Western Australia. She has won many prizes and awards, in 1986, the 1st International Ceramics Contest Mino, Japan, (Award with Honorable Mention for outstanding achievement) and the 1999 Premio Diputacio da Valencia; International BiennalManises, Museu de ceramic de Manises, Spain among others.

Biography
After completing  an Art Foundation Degree from University of Salford, formerly known as Salford College of Technology 1971–73, Babuniak went on to Sheffield Hallam University formerly Sheffield School of Art and Design 1973-76 studying under Professor Tony Franks,  where  she gained a Bachelor of Arts degree in fine art and sculpture, with Film and Photography as subsidiary subjects under Professor Tom Ryall.

Babuniak's career as a professional artist began in North Wales in 1980 when she was awarded a grant by the Welsh Arts Council for a solo exhibition. In 1981 she moved to Germany, where she has a studio at Gmund am Tegernsee in Bavaria.

The 1980s saw the development and acceptance of her work by galleries and exhibitions in England, Germany, Italy, France and in Japan. 
In 1992, Babuniak exhibited in the “Encuentro” exhibition with Carmen Sanchez and Lotte Reimers at the Gonzalez Marti Museum in Valencia, Spain.  In 1999 she was awarded the Premio Diputacio da Valencia at the international Biennial in Manises. In 2004 Babuniak received the L’Alcalaten prize at the international biennial in L'Alcora, Spain.

Selection for the Chelsea Crafts Fair, London in 1988/89/92/95 brought her into contact with the British Arts Council’s Contemporary Applied Arts with whom she exhibited in 1994/95 and other collectors including Sir John Makepeace and innovative exhibitions such as at Pulbrook and Gould ’s Westonbirt School in London. 
Work was purchased for the collection at the Victoria and Albert Museum, London, and exhibited at The Scottish Gallery in Edinburgh under the curatorship of Amanda Game where it was purchased for the Royal Museum of Scotland, now under the management of the National Museum of Scotland.
Babuniak’s work has been exhibited in Mino in Japan, where she received honourable mentions at international exhibitions, and also in Kyoto. In 2005 she was invited as an artist-in-residence to Shigaraki in Japan  and from this followed a solo exhibition, Cross-over, under the curatorship of Hiroshi Kawaguchi at the Noritake Garden Gallery  in Nagoya.

In 2008 at the “Junges Porzellan” exhibition in Selb, Germany, Babuniak was approached by Jürgen Schärer, author  of  Auf den Punkt gebracht  and project leader in Meissen, who invited her to become part of the design team of ceramic artists on the project to celebrate 300 years of the Meissen Porcelain. However, following the threat of  bankruptcy,  a radical overhaul, of the Meissen Porzellanmanufaktur by Dr. Christian Krutzke, saved the Porzellanmanufaktur but resulted in  the project being abandoned.

Work
The earlier years of her career saw experimentation projected from organic forms. These works intentionally never evolved into functional objects, as she rejected function in favour of a greater power of expression.

By the 90's, the incorporation of other materials such as stainless steel and precious metals, reveals a more transcending aspect of her sculpture, delineating and architectural in tone.

Babuniak's work is minimalist, disciplined and reserved, drawing on suburban landscapes where the subject matter is reduced to the essential characteristics.
Her use and juxtaposition of apparently incongruous materials: bone china, porcelain, Poly(methyl)methacrylate , fine wire, stainless steel, and paper create tension within the harmony of the pattern.

In addition to international awards and plaudits, Babuniak has a following of private and public collectors and publications about her work have appeared in many countries.

Collections
Bayerische Staatsgemäldesammlung, München, Germany
City Art Gallery, Manchester, England
City of Kapfenberg, Austria
City Museum, Varazdin, Croatia
Collection of John Makepeace, Fars, Beaminster, Dorset, England
Dresdner Bank, München, Germany
Faenza International Ceramics Museum, Italy
Grassi Museum, Leipzig, Germany
Museum für Angewandte Kunst, Frankfurt, Germany
Museum of Kyoto, Japan
Museu L’Alcora, Spain
Museo Nacional Gonzalez Marti, Valencia, Spain 
Museu Manises, Spain
Neue Sammlung, München, Germany
Raiffeisenbank, Germany
National Museum of Scotland, Edinburgh
Sammlung Hinder/Reimers, Schloss Villa Ludwigshöhe, Edenkoben, Germany
Sammlung Hoffmann, Berlin, Germany
Sammlung Paetzold, Schloß Friedenstein, Gotha, Germany
Sammlung Thiemann, Schloß Rheinbeck, Hamburg, Germany
Shigaraki Museum of Modern Ceramics, Cultural Park, Japan
Universalmuseum Joanneuem, Graz, Austria
Victoria & Albert Museum, London, England

Art Ventures
In 1987 Roma Babuniak founded the Studio Galerie in Gmund, Germany showing artists such as Vladimir Strelnikov  a member of the Odessa Group, Soviet Nonconformist Artists, and German expressionist Georg Dudek.

Demands of her own career brought a temporary halt to the Studio Galerie which was relaunched in 2009 and focused on the concept of contemporary international artists from Germany and Japan:  Christian Heß, Takao Inoue, Herbert Klee, Albert Lohr, Akashi Murakami, Christine Ott, Angelika Sieger, Georg Thumbach and others.

2001- 2009 she founded and curated “Windows for Show” in Tegernsee, Germany. This was an innovative concept which brought together six interregional artists who exhibited together for 3 months in an environment not traditionally associated with art exhibitions, but which promoted direct exposure to the public.

Babuniak has been a member of the AK68 Art Society in Wasserburg am Inn, Germany since 1998. From 2008 until 2013 she served on the Board, and is still on the consulting panel. In this time, she was instrumental in instigating the exhibitions of Albert Lohr, Christine Ott with Christian Heß and Stephanie Müller.

Since 2013, she has been involved in the founding and curating of a newly built, international gallery in Kalamunda, Western Australia, expected to open in February 2016.

Exhibitions and Events

Exhibitions
1976	Degree Show, Mappin Art Gallery, Sheffield, England
1981	Kunstkammer Dr. Paul Köster, Mönchengladbach, Germany
1983/86/05  	Concorso Internazionale, Museum Faenza, Italy  
1984    1st World Triennial of Small Ceramics, Museum Zagreb, Jugoslawia
1985	Zeitgenössische Keramik‘, Spitalspeicher, Offenburg, Germany
1986	Concorso Internazionale, Museum Faenza, Italy
1986   1st International Ceramics Contest, Mino, Japan, Award with Honorable Mention for outstanding achievement
1986   1st Kyoto International Craft Competition, Kyoto, Japan, Award with Meritorious Achievement
1987   ‘Aspekte Zeitgenössische Keramik aus Europe‘
1987   Kulturamt Stuttgart and Badisches Landesmuseum Karlsruhe, Germany
1988   Museum für Moderne Keramik, with Seung Ho Yang, Germany
1989   Galerie L, with Robin Welch and Elizabeth Pluquet, Hamburg, Germany
1990  	Internationale BIennale, Vallauris, France
1990	‘Moderne Unikate aus 14 Ländern‘, Schloß Rheinbeck, Hamburg, Germany
1991   Solo exhibition, Royal Exchange, Manchester, England
1991   Angermuseum Erfurt, with Pit Nicolas, Brigitte Schuller, Klaus Lehmann, Germany 
1992 	International Ceramics Competition, Mino, Japan, Award with Honorable Mention
1993   The Scottish Gallery, with Lotte Reimers, Edinburgh, Scotland 
1993	Galerie im Hörsaal, Leipzig, Germany
1993	Galerie Painen, with Jürgen Grenzemann, Berlin, Germany
1994  	Contemporary Applied Arts, London
1995  	Cecilia Coleman Gallery, with Dorothy Gill, London 
1997	Biennale Europea, Manises, Spain
1998 	Adrian Sassoon, London, England
2002   XII Biennal Esplugues, Barcelona, Spain
2002   Perron Preis exhibition, Erkenbert Museum, Frankenthal, Germany
2003  	Alt trifft Neu“, Sammlung Paetzold, Schloß Friedenstein, Gotha, Germany                                                                                  
2004 	‘Hautnah‘, Haus der Kunst, München, Germany
2005   Artist- in- Residence, Shigaraki, Japan
2006	Biennale de la Sculpture, Mamer, Luxembourg
2007	5. International Biennial, Kapfenberg, Austria; Award: Purchase Prize of the City of Kapfenberg  
2008   Mino International Ceramics (1st selection) Japan 
2009   ‘Multiplex’, City Museum of Varazdin, Croatia
2009   Galerie Bruckmühl with Sylvia Hatzl, Germany
2011   ‘Sehnsucht nach der Ferne’, conceptual members exhibition, AK68, Wasserburg am Inn, Germany
2012   Galerie ob der Kap with André Lambotte, and Kathrin Fischborn, Luxembourg
2013  ‘Gefäß und Skulptur’, Grassi Museum, Leipzig, Germany           
2014/15  Mandjar Art exhibition, Mandurah, Western Australia

Events
1978-1980   Exhibitions with the North Wales Artists Association, UK
1988/89/92/95	Chelsea Crafts Fair, London, UK
1985   ‘Unikate‘, Handwerkskammer für Oberbayern 30.11-8.12. Germany
1986   ‘Das Flair des Kunsthandwerks‘, Handwerkskammer Oberbayern, München, Germany
1993   ‘Eating- In’, House and Garden Show, Business Design Centre London, UK
2003   ‘Tischkultur‘, in co-operation with Toni Bösterling, Fairs in Augsburg, Braunschweig, Rosenheim, Germany
2003-2012   Tegernseer Kunstausstellung, Germany
2002-2012   Gmundart, Germany

References

External links
 www.romababuniak.com

1952 births
Living people
20th-century English women artists
21st-century English women artists
20th-century ceramists
21st-century ceramists
Alumni of the University of Salford
Alumni of Sheffield Hallam University
British women ceramicists
English contemporary artists